Mohammad Kaif  (born 1 December 1980) is a former Indian cricketer, who played Tests and ODIs. He made it to the national team on the strength of his performances at the Under-19 level, where he captained the India national under-19 cricket team to victory in the Under-19 World Cup in 2000.

He retired from all formats of cricket on 13 July 2018.

Personal life

Kaif was born in a middle-class family on 1 December 1980 in Allahabad, Uttar Pradesh, India. He started his career from Green Park Hostel, Kanpur. His father Mohammad Tarif Ansari played for the Railways cricket team and the Uttar Pradesh cricket team . His brother Mohammad Saif plays for Madhya Pradesh cricket team & Uttar Pradesh cricket team.

Kaif married Pooja Yadav, a Noida-based journalist, in 2011. They have 2 children, a son named Kabir and a daughter named Eva.

Early days
As of July 2005, Kaif was one of the only five cricketers from Uttar Pradesh state to have represented India on international level. In 2009, the Indian team was well represented by Uttar Pradesh with as many as three regulars, Suresh Raina, Praveen Kumar and Rudra Pratap Singh in the ODI team.
He was the captain of both Central Zone and Uttar Pradesh. He also captained the national ODI team in the 2005/06 Challenger Trophy in the absence of regular captain Rahul Dravid.

International career 

Kaif made his Test debut in 2000 against South Africa in Bangalore soon after, and was selected in the first intake of the National Cricket Academy in Bangalore.

His early international career was considered patchy, with the occasional outstanding performance backed up by ordinary batting. His most famous feat was helping India chase down 326 with 87* (off 75 balls) in the 2002 NatWest Series Final. The effort earned him his first Man of the Match award.

In the series against Bangladesh in late 2004, he was named Man of the Series award for his consistency in all the three ODIs.

Kaif earned himself a Test cap against South Africa while he was quite young at the age of 20, though soon later he was dropped from the national side because of some ordinary performances. Kaif made a good comeback to the Test side against Australia late in 2004 scoring two half-centuries.

He was a quick runner between the wickets and an excellent cover fielder, most notable for his agility and throwing accuracy. He holds the record for the most catches by a fielder in a World Cup match – four, against Sri Lanka in the 2003 World Cup at Johannesburg on 10 March 2003.

Middle Order 
The team management tend to use him in the middle order, though his successes have almost always come playing high up – at number 3 rather on number 7. He was often seen scoring more runs while he got some time to settle on the pitch. His usual position in domestic games and in county cricket has been at number 3. But given the number of players in that mould, such as Dravid, Raina, and Yuvraj, Kaif found it difficult to play at the number 3 spot on a consistent basis. With the arrival of Greg Chappell and Rahul Dravid being appointed captain, the number 3 slot was given to either Irfan Pathan or Mahendra Singh Dhoni to accelerate the scoring rate.

In March 2006, he was recalled to the Test team in place of the injured Yuvraj Singh for the First Test against England in Nagpur. Despite top-scoring with a dogged 91 to save the Test match, he was omitted for the following match when Yuvraj had recovered his fitness. But he found a place in the four Tests in the West Indies, after Sachin Tendulkar was injured. He scored 148 not out in the second Test, his maiden Test century.

In late 2006, he was dropped from the ODI team and Test squad. In April 2008, he was recalled to the Test squad for the Second Test against South Africa but did not play.

His techniques of quick running between the wickets whilst rotating the strike but reducing considerable pressure while chasing without even playing much boundaries as well as his ability to break down the chase being in the middle-order has been observed as an adaptation of a similar approach by Michael Bevan.

Fielding 
He was one of the best fielders in the world of cricket, along with Yuvraj Singh. Yuvraj would be positioned on point and Kaif in the covers, and it was a tough call for the opposition to score past this pair; the standard of Indian fielding improved significantly when they were on the field. Unfortunately, many times Kaif couldn't be in the "playing 11" as Yuvraj served the purpose of an all-rounder and was a senior player in the team.

Domestic career
Kaif represented the victorious Rajasthan Royals in the inaugural edition of the Indian Premier League in 2008. He was bought for US$685,000 as an iconic player. Even though he played in all the matches for the team, he had a poor run in the series, mustering only 176 runs at an average of 16. On 15 April 2009, he was axed by Rajasthan Royals team management, which cited his poor form and cost-cutting for the omission from the squad for the 2009 season.

Kaif was bought for US$250,000 by Kings XI Punjab to play in 2010 Indian Premier League.

Kaif was bought by Royal Challengers Bangalore to play in 2011 Indian Premier League, in the third round of bidding. He was the only player requested to appear for bidding for the third time. Later in an interview, Subrata Roy of Sahara India stated that he requested a third round of bidding because he thought that Kaif should find a place in an IPL team.

Coaching career 

In February 2017, Gujarat Lions named Kaif assistant coach of Brad Hodge for 2017 Indian Premier League.
He was named the assistant coach for Delhi Capitals for the 2019 Indian Premier League and 2020 Indian Premier League.

Beyond cricket

Political career

He joined Indian National Congress and contested 2014 Loksabha election from Phulpur in Uttar Pradesh, and lost to Keshav Prasad Maurya of the BJP.

References

External links
 Mohammad Kaif – Profile and Stats – Cricbuzz.com

1980 births
Living people
Derbyshire cricketers
India One Day International cricketers
India Test cricketers
Indian Muslims
Leicestershire cricketers
Uttar Pradesh cricketers
Central Zone cricketers
Cricketers at the 2003 Cricket World Cup
Cricketers from Allahabad
Indian cricketers
Rajasthan Royals cricketers
Punjab Kings cricketers
Royal Challengers Bangalore cricketers
India Green cricketers
India Red cricketers
United Progressive Alliance candidates in the 2014 Indian general election
Andhra cricketers
Indian cricket commentators
Chhattisgarh cricketers
Indian National Congress politicians from Uttar Pradesh